In macroeconomics, a wage-price spiral (also called a wage/price spiral or price/wage spiral) is a proposed explanation for inflation, in which wage increases cause price increases which in turn cause wage increases, in a positive feedback loop. Greg Mankiw writes, "At some point, this spiral of ever-rising wages and prices will slow... In the long run, the economy returns to [the point] where the aggregate-demand curve crosses the long-run aggregate-supply curve."

History

An early use of the concept was in 1868. The term "wage-price spiral" appeared in a 1937 New York Times article about a steel-workers' strike. In the 1970s, US President Richard Nixon attempted to break what he saw as a "spiral" of prices and costs, by imposing a price freeze, with little effect.

Some sources distinguish between wage-price spirals and price-wage spirals.

According to Daniel J.B. Mitchell and Christopher L. Erickson, the concept fell out of favor with the decline of unions and collective bargaining. They write, "With the rapid pace of union membership decline in the early 1980s, followed by erosion relative to the overall workforce thereafter, it became progressively difficult to tie inflation to unions, and thus to worker demands."

Olivier J. Blanchard argues that the concept fell out of favor with the rise of rational expectations theory. Blanchard attempts to rehabilitate the concept.

Criticism

The Socialist Worker argues that it is a myth used to prevent wage increases. Tribune magazine also sees the concept as rhetoric intended to hold down worker wages.

Milton Friedman criticised the concept of wage-price spirals, arguing "It's the external manifestation of inflation, but not its source... the inflation arises from one and only one reason: an increase in a quantity of money." Wage-price spirals will break naturally if the quantity of money is not increased, albeit in the meanwhile "there will for
a time be a continuation of inflation" as well as "some measure of recession and unemployment".

See also 
Cost-push inflation
Demand-pull inflation

References 

Inflation